The Fuscher Ache is a river of Salzburg, Austria, a right tributary of the River Salzach.

It flows from south to north through the valley of the same name, passing the small village of Fusch an der Großglocknerstraße. It supplies a drinking water reservoir for the village, its water quality being very high. It is rich in fish such as brown trout, grayling and char. After about  it empties into the Salzach at Bruck an der Großglocknerstraße.

References

Rivers of Salzburg (state)
Glockner Group
Fusch an der Großglocknerstraße
Rivers of Austria